Gufkral ('' means cave and '' means potter) is a site inhabited by potters who utilize the caves.  Caves and archeological site are located at Banmir village in the Tral Tehsil of the Pulwama District, in the Kashmir Valley of Indian-administered Kashmir. The cave of Gufkral is one of the oldest cave in Kashmir and some estimates trace their origin 2000-3000 BCE.

The excavation by an Archaeological Survey of India team led by A K Sharma from 18 August to 20 October in 1981 revealed that the site was occupied for five periods from the Aceramic Neolithic to Megalithic periods.

Location

References 

Caves of Jammu and Kashmir
Archaeological sites in Jammu and Kashmir
Archaeological sites in India